Matilda Sergeant (born 13 March 1999) is an Australian rules footballer who played for the Fremantle Football Club in the AFL Women's (AFLW). Sergeant was drafted by Fremantle with their second last selection and 64th overall in the 2018 AFL Women's draft. She made her debut in Fremantle's win against  at Fremantle Oval in Round 5 of the 2019 season. In March 2023, Sergeant was delisted by Fremantle.

References

External links 

1999 births
Living people
Fremantle Football Club (AFLW) players
Australian rules footballers from Western Australia
People educated at Newman College, Perth